The men's 100 metres sprint event at the 1968 Olympic Games took place at Estadio Olímpico Universitario in Mexico City, Mexico, on October 13 and 14. Sixty-five athletes from 42 nations took part. Each nation was limited to 3 runners by rules in place since the 1930 Olympic Congress. The final was won by American Jim Hines, the second consecutive time the event was won by an American (and the nation's 12th title in the event overall). Jamaica won its first medal in the event since 1952.

Background

This was the sixteenth time the event was held, having appeared at every Olympics since the first in 1896. The gold medalist from 1964, American Bob Hayes, did not return (playing in the National Football League instead), but Tokyo silver medalist Cuban Enrique Figuerola and bronze medalist Canadian Harry Jerome did. The American team was led by Jim Hines and Charles Greene, two of the three men to establish the world record at 9.9 seconds during the Night of Speed; Mel Pender, a 1964 finalist, was the third member of the team. Jamaican Lennox Miller was the strongest challenger to the Americans.

El Salvador, Nicaragua, Puerto Rico, Suriname, and Tanzania were represented in the event for the first time. East and West Germany also competed separately for the first time. The United States was the only nation to have appeared at each of the first sixteen Olympic men's 100 metres events.

Competition format

The event retained the same basic four round format from 1920–1964: heats, quarterfinals, semifinals, and a final. A significant change, however, was the introduction of the "fastest loser" system. Previously, advancement depended solely on the runners' place in their heat. The 1968 competition added advancement places to the fastest runners across the heats in the first round who did not advance based on place.

The first round consisted of nine heats, most with 7–8 athletes but the first having only 5. The top three runners in each heat advanced, along with the next five fastest runners overall. This made 32 quarterfinalists, who were divided into four heats of 8 runners. The top four runners in each quarterfinal advanced (with no "fastest loser" provision in rounds after the first). The 16 semifinalists competed in two heats of 8, with the top four in each semifinal advancing to the eight-man final.

Records

Prior to the competition, the existing World and Olympic records were as follows.

Jim Hines had a time of 9.9 seconds (hand-timed) or 9.95 seconds (auto-timed) in the final. This equalled the world record and set a new Olympic record, which were measured by hand-timing at that point. The 9.95 second time was recognized as the initial world record for electronic timed results when the IAAF changed its records rules in 1977.

Results

Heats

The top three runners in each of the nine heats, and the next fastest five, advanced to the quarterfinal round.

Heat 1

The 2.8 m/s tailwind made this heat ineligible for records.

Heat 2

Heat 3

Heat 4

Heat 5

Heat 6

The tailwind of 3.8 m/s made this heat ineligible for records.

Heat 7

Heat 8

Heat 9

Quarterfinals

The top four runners in each of the four heats advanced to the semifinal round.

Quarterfinal 1

Quarterfinal 2

Quarterfinal 3

The 4.2 m/s tailwind made this heat ineligible for records.

Quarterfinal 4

Semifinals

The top four runners in each of the two heats advanced to the final round.

Semifinal 1

Semifinal 2

Final

Mel Pender and Charlie Greene were known for their fast starts.  In the final, while Greene reacted to the gun noticeably slower, Pender did not disappoint, taking a quick lead.  Greene, Lennox Miller and Jim Hines were the next chase group, the three outer lanes already left behind.  The diminutive Pender's lead disappeared, the much larger Miller leading the group in passing by the halfway point.  Hines was just getting into gear, exploding past Miller and putting a gap on the field to take the race by two metres.  Miller leaned but he already had a metre on Green who was a metre ahead of Pablo Montes, Roger Bambuck and Pender to take the bronze.

Wind speed = +

References

Athletics at the 1968 Summer Olympics
100 metres at the Olympics
Men's events at the 1968 Summer Olympics